John Southby (c. 1650 – 1741), of Carswell Manor, Buckland, Berkshire (now Oxfordshire), was an English Member of Parliament for Abingdon in 1689–90.

References

1650s births
1741 deaths
English MPs 1689–1690
Members of the Parliament of Great Britain for English constituencies
People from Buckland, Oxfordshire